Emmett is a city in Pottawatomie County, Kansas, United States.  As of the 2020 census, the population of the city was 170.

History
The first post office in Emmett was established in November 1905. The community was named for Robert Emmet, an Irish nationalist.

Geography
Emmett is located at  (39.307092, -96.056368).

Demographics

Emmett is part of the Manhattan, Kansas Metropolitan Statistical Area.

2010 census
As of the census of 2010, there were 191 people, 71 households, and 43 families residing in the city. The racial makeup of the city was 89.0% White, 1.6% African American, 1.6% Native American, 0.5% Pacific Islander, 0.5% from other races, and 6.8% from two or more races. Hispanic or Latino of any race were 10.5% of the population.

There were 71 households, of which 36.6% had children under the age of 18 living with them, 47.9% were married couples living together, 2.8% had a female householder with no husband present, 9.9% had a male householder with no wife present, and 39.4% were non-families. 33.8% of all households were made up of individuals, and 8.4% had someone living alone who was 65 years of age or older. The average household size was 2.69 and the average family size was 3.58.

The median age in the city was 27.2 years. 33.5% of residents were under the age of 18; 14% were between the ages of 18 and 24; 20.4% were from 25 to 44; 21.9% were from 45 to 64; and 9.9% were 65 years of age or older. The gender makeup of the city was 56.0% male and 44.0% female.

2000 census
As of the census of 2000, there were 277 people, 103 households, and 66 families residing in the city. The racial makeup of the city was 93.50% White, 5.42% Native American, and 1.08% from two or more races. Hispanic or Latino of any race were 1.44% of the population.

There were 103 households, out of which 30.1% had children under the age of 18 living with them, 49.5% were married couples living together, 9.7% had a female householder with no husband present, and 35.0% were non-families. 29.1% of all households were made up of individuals, and 8.7% had someone living alone who was 65 years of age or older. The average household size was 2.69 and the average family size was 3.40.

In the city, the population was spread out, with 33.6% under the age of 18, 5.8% from 18 to 24, 28.5% from 25 to 44, 21.3% from 45 to 64, and 10.8% who were 65 years of age or older. The median age was 34 years. For every 100 females, there were 103.7 males. For every 100 females age 18 and over, there were 109.1 males.

The median income for a household in the city was $27,778, and the median income for a family was $27,750. Males had a median income of $35,208 versus $14,750 for females. The per capita income for the city was $12,078. About 20.0% of families and 27.3% of the population were below the poverty line, including 46.3% of those under the age of eighteen and 17.1% of those 65 or over.

Education
The community is served by Kaw Valley USD 321 public school district.  High school students attend St. Marys Jr/Sr High School in St. Marys. The St. Marys High School mascot is Bears.

Emmett High School was closed through school unification. The Emmett High School mascot was Emmett Eagles.

References

Further reading

External links
 Emmett - Directory of Public Officials
 Emmett city map, KDOT

Cities in Kansas
Cities in Pottawatomie County, Kansas
Manhattan, Kansas metropolitan area